Samu is a given name of various origins, often derived from Samuel.

Notable people with this given name include:

 Samu Balázs (1906–1981), Hungarian actor
 Samu Bola (born 1983), Fijian rugby union player
 Samu Fóti (1890–1916), Hungarian gymnast
 Samu Haber (born 1976), Finnish singer and songwriter
 Samu Hazai (1851–1942), Hungarian military officer and politician
 Samu Heikkilä (born 1971), Finnish film editor
 Samu Isosalo (born 1981), Finnish ice hockey player
 Samu Kerevi (born 1993), Fijian-Australian rugby union player
 Samu Manoa (born 1985), American rugby union player
 Samu Nieminen (born 1992), Finnish association football player
 Samu Pecz (1854–1922), Hungarian architect and academic
 Samu Sunim (born 1941), Korean Buddhist monk
 Samu Valelala, Fijian rugby league player
 Samu Vilkman, Finnish ice hockey player
 Samu Wara (born 1986), Australian rugby union footballer
 Samu (footballer) (born 1996), Portuguese footballer
 Samú (born 2000), Portuguese footballer

See also
 Samuel (name)
 Samu (surname)
 Samu (disambiguation)

Finnish masculine given names